Eddie Hunter may refer to:

 Eddie Hunter (footballer, born 1928) (1928–2002), Scottish footballer (Falkirk FC)
 Eddie Hunter (footballer, born 1943), Scottish footballer and manager (Queen's Park)
 Eddie Hunter (baseball) (1905–1967), Major League Baseball third baseman
 Eddie Hunter (EastEnders), fictional character on the British soap opera EastEnders
 Eddie "Skate" Hunter, fictional character in the Streets of Rage video game series
 Eddie Hunter (American football) (born 1965), American football player